The B3 DNA binding domain (DBD) is a highly conserved domain found exclusively in transcription factors (≥40 species) combined with other domains. It consists of 100-120 residues, includes seven beta strands and two alpha helices that form a DNA-binding pseudobarrel protein fold; it interacts with the major groove of DNA.

B3 families 

In Arabidopsis thaliana, there are three main families of transcription factors that contain B3 domain:
 ARF (Auxin Response Factors)
 ABI3 (ABscisic acid Insensitive3)
 RAV (Related to ABI3/VP1)

Related proteins 

The N-terminal domain of restriction endonuclease EcoRII; the C-terminal domain of restriction endonuclease BfiI possess a similar DNA-binding pseudobarrel protein fold.

See also 

Restriction endonuclease EcoRII
Auxin
Abscisic acid

References

External links
 DBD database of predicted transcription factors  Uses a curated set of DNA-binding domains to predict transcription factors in all completely sequenced genomes
Classification in the "Transcription factors" table according to the Transfac database.
Database of Arabidopsis Transcription Factors
B3 , RAV, and ARF  family at PlantTFDB:Plant Transcription Factor Database

Molecular genetics
Gene expression
Transcription factors
Protein domains